Neuroblastoma breakpoint family, member 15, also known as NBPF15, is a protein which in humans is encoded by the NBPF15 gene. The gene is 18762 bp long, with mRNA that is 3837 bp long. The gene is located on chromosome 1q21.1. Its sub-cellular location is predicted to be in the nucleus and cytoplasm. It contains what is known as the NBPF repeat, which is a two-exon stretch of sequence that is characteristic of all 21 members of the NBPF gene family. The repeat is considered the ancestral exons, and the NBPF family has been linked to primate evolution.

Function 
The function of NBPF16 is not fully understood. It is a member of the NBPF family of proteins, which have been linked to possible roles in oncogenesis and tumor suppressor genes.

Protein 
The protein is composed of 670 amino acids. The gene contains five domains of unknown function, called DUF1220. DUF1220 domains are found in all members of the NBPF gene family, although the number differs between each member. Repetitive structure with high intergenic and intragenic sequence conservation, both in coding and noncoding regions. Makes it possible for homologous recombination to occur easily between different alleles. The repetitiveness of it, and the other members of the NBPF gene family is thought to have arisen from segmental duplications on chromosome 1.

Predicted properties 
Properties of NBPF16 that were predicted using bioinformatics tools:
 Molecular weight: 76 kD
 Isoelectric point: 4.43
 Post-translational modification: none predicted.
 No predicted signal peptide or signal peptide cleavage site.
 No interacting proteins or binding partners.

Expression 
There is little to no expression data available for the gene, but most indications point to it being ubiquitously expressed throughout the body.

Homology

Orthologs 

There exists no great orthologs outside of primates. These orthologs were gathered from BLAT. and BLAST searches

Paralogs 
Due to there being 21 other members of the NBPF gene family, there are 21 paralogs of NBPF16. They all show high conservation and repetitive structures.

References

Further reading 
 

Human proteins